St. Mary's Mission may refer to:

 St. Mary's Mission (Kansas), a Jesuit mission founded in 1847 along the Oregon Trail
 St. Mary's Mission (Montana), a historic mission church in Stevensville, Montana